Sigurður Valur Sveinsson (born 5 March 1959) is an Icelandic former handball player who competed in the 1984 Summer Olympics and in the 1988 Summer Olympics.

References

1959 births
Living people
Sigurdur Sveinsson
Sigurdur Sveinsson
Handball players at the 1984 Summer Olympics
Handball players at the 1988 Summer Olympics